The Venerable William Robinson DD (d. 1642) was Archdeacon of Nottingham.

Family
He was the son of John Robinson of Reading, Berkshire and Lucy Webb.

He married Sarah Bainbrigge, daughter of William Bainbrigge of Lockington, Leicestershire. They had the following children:
John Robinson became 1st Robinson Baronet of London.
Henry Robinson, rector of Long Whatton.

Career
He was a Fellow of Queens' College, Cambridge from 1590 to 1603 and University Preacher.

He was appointed:
Prebendary of St David's Cathedral
Canon of the 5th Prebend of Westminster Abbey 1608 - 1642
Archdeacon of Nottingham 1635 - 1642
Rector of Church of St. Mary and All Saints, Bingham 1635 - 1642
Rector of All Saints Church, Long Whatton

He was buried in All Saints Church, Long Whatton, Leicestershire.

Notes 

1642 deaths
17th-century English Anglican priests
Archdeacons of Nottingham
Fellows of Queens' College, Cambridge
Year of birth missing